Haryana Gold was an Indian professional basketball team based in Haryana. The team last competed in the UBA Pro Basketball League as a member of the North Division. The team was established in 2015.

Franchise history
The Haryana Gold became one of the UBA's most well-balanced teams in Season 1 on the strength of the league's most prolific backcourt in the first season. Vikas was the league's 6th leading scorer averaging 17.3 points and Birender was the 9th leading scorer as he averaged 16.2 PPG. Haryana finished with a 5–1 record in the regular season.

Season-by-season record

Players

References

External links
Presentation at Asia-basket.com
Facebook

Basketball teams in India
Basketball in Haryana
Basketball teams established in 2015